Henry Creek is a stream in the U.S. state of Kansas.

Henry Creek was named for Henry Comstock, a pioneer who settled there.

See also
List of rivers of Kansas

References

Rivers of Butler County, Kansas
Rivers of Kansas